South Ayrshire is one of thirty-two council areas of Scotland, covering the southern part of Ayrshire. It borders onto Dumfries and Galloway, East Ayrshire and North Ayrshire. The area had an estimated population in 2021 of 112,450.

History
South Ayrshire was created in 1996 under the Local Government etc. (Scotland) Act 1994, which replaced Scotland's previous local government structure of upper-tier regions and lower-tier districts with unitary council areas providing all local government services. South Ayrshire covered the same area as the abolished Kyle and Carrick district, and also took over the functions of the abolished Strathclyde Regional Council within the area. The area's name references its location within the historic county of Ayrshire, which had been abolished for local government purposes in 1975 when Kyle and Carrick district and Strathclyde region had been created.

In 2021, South Ayrshire submitted a bid for city status as part of the 2022 Platinum Jubilee Celebrations. The bid was based on the area's rich history and links to royalty, and received backing from organisations and businesses including Ayrshire College and Scottish Enterprise. The bid was ultimately unsuccessful, with eight other settlements across the UK, overseas territories and crown dependencies being awarded city status, including Scottish town Dunfermline.

Geography

Geographically, South Ayrshire is located on the western coast of Scotland, sharing borders with neighbouring local authorities East Ayrshire, Dumfries and Galloway and North Ayrshire. The climate in South Ayrshire, typical of that in western Scotland, is milder than that of eastern Scotland due to the stronger maritime influence, as the prevailing winds blow from the sea into South Ayrshire, which is located primarily on the western coast of Scotland. The warm Gulf Stream also has a strong influence on western Scotland. With winds mainly blowing from the sea the annual mean temperatures are in the range  in coastal areas of South Ayrshire such as Ayr and Troon.

The sea reaches its lowest temperature in February or early March so that on average February is the coldest month in some coastal parts of South Ayrshire along with the Rhins of Galloway, Kintyre and the Hebrides. In February the mean daily minimum temperature varies from about 2 °C in most of the islands, 1 to 2 °C along most of the Solway Firth and lowland inland areas, but less than −1 °C in parts of the Southern Uplands and central Highlands. Inland, where the influence of the sea is less, January is the coldest month with mean daily minimum temperatures generally between −3 and 0 °C.

The number of hours of natural sunshine in South Ayrshire is controlled by the length of day and by cloudiness. In general, December is the dullest month and May or June the sunniest. Sunshine duration decreases with increasing altitude, increasing latitude and distance from the coast. Local topography also exerts a strong influence and in the winter deep glens and north-facing slopes can be in shade for long periods. Industrial pollution and smoke haze can also reduce sunshine amounts, but the decline in heavy industry in the Ayrshire area, primarily in Ayr in South Ayrshire along with Kilmarnock in East Ayrshire, has resulted in an increase in sunshine duration particularly in the winter months.

Settlements

South Ayrshire's population is mostly concentrated around the adjoining coastal towns of Ayr, Prestwick and Troon located to the north-west of the council, which represents 68% of the council's total population according to data derived from the 2011 census, with a combined population of 76,846. Other areas of significance include the towns of Maybole and Girvan which are located to the south of the council area in the district of Carrick.

A list of settlements in South Ayrshire may be found below:

Towns
Ayr
Girvan
Prestwick
Troon
Maybole

Villages and hamlets
 

Alloway (Suburb of Ayr)
Annbank
Ballantrae
Barassie (Suburb of Troon)
Barr
Barrhill
Colmonell
Coodham
Coylton
Craigie
Crosshill
Dailly
Dundonald
Dunure
Failford
Joppa (Suburb of Coylton)
Kirkmichael
Kirkoswald
Lendalfoot
Loans
Maidens
Monkton
Mossblown
Minishant
Old Dailly
Pinmore
Pinwherry
Straiton
Symington
Tarbolton
Turnberry

Places of interest

Ailsa Craig
Bachelor's Club, Tarbolton
Bargany Gardens
Blairquhan
Burns Cottage
Burns National Heritage Park (Robert Burns)
Carrick Forest
Crossraguel Abbey
Culzean Castle
Electric Brae
Penkill Castle
Souter Johnnie's Cottage
Royal Troon Golf Club
Turnberry Hotel and Golf Course

Economy

The economy of South Ayrshire, like many other areas, was badly affected during the worldwide financial crisis from 2009–2012. Despite this, total Gross Value Added for South Ayrshire has seen a steady increase over the last 20 years, reaching a peak in 2015 of £2.4 million. South Ayrshire’s GVA represents 1.9% of the total Scottish Gross Value Added income which is consistent with the previous 20 years. The largest employment industry in South Ayrshire and Scotland is the public administration, education and health sector. Compared with Scotland, proportionally there are more South Ayrshire residents employed in this sector than Scotland, while there are proportionally fewer employed in banking, finance and insurance sector than Scotland. Despite being a costal area, the smallest employment in South Ayrshire is in the agriculture and fishing sector.

The council and its neighbours of East Ayrshire and North Ayrshire work together on economic growth as the Ayrshire Regional Economic Partnership, with support from the Scottish and UK governments and other private and public sector organisations.

Education

Educational provision in South Ayrshire is offered via eight secondary schools, forty-one primary schools, two special needs schools and five stand-alone Early Years Centres (although some primary schools have Early Years Centres attached). In terms of early years provision, there are also a number of private establishments which are operated in conjunction with South Ayrshire Council, rather than managed and operated entirely by the council. Based on figures from the 2016-2017 academic year, within South Ayrshire, there were 6,091 secondary school aged pupils, 7,855 primary school aged pupils and 251 pupils attending special educational needs provision establishments.

Governance

The council has been under no overall control since 2003, in which time various coalitions and minority administrations have operated. Since the last election in 2022, the council has been led by a Conservative minority administration which took office with support from two independent councillors and abstentions from Labour. The next election is due in 2027.

The council's civic head takes the title of provost. This is a largely ceremonial role, chairing council meetings and acting as the area's first citizen. Although an elected councillor, the provost is expected to be politically impartial. Political leadership is provided by the leader of the council.

Political control
The first election to South Ayrshire Council was held in 1995, initially operating as a shadow authority alongside the outgoing authorities until the new system came into force on 1 April 1996. Political control of the council since 1996 has been as follows:

Leadership
The leaders of the council since 1996 have been:

Elections
Since 2007 elections have been held every five years under the single transferable vote system, introduced by the Local Governance (Scotland) Act 2004. Election results since 1995 have been as follows:

Premises
The council is based at County Buildings on Wellington Square in Ayr, which had been built in 1931 as the headquarters for the old Ayrshire County Council, being an extension to the older Sheriff Court built in 1818. When South Ayrshire Council was created in 1996 it inherited the former Kyle and Carrick District Council's offices at Burns House on Burns Statue Square in Ayr as well as County Buildings, the latter having been used between 1975 and 1996 as an area office for Strathclyde Regional Council. In 2019 the council consolidated its offices into County Buildings. Burns House was subsequently demolished in 2021, creating a new open space, landscaped with funding from the Scottish Government.

Wards

Since 2017 the area has been divided into eight wards, all electing either three or four councillors:
Ayr East (3)
Ayr North (4)
Ayr West (4)
Girvan and South Carrick (3)
Kyle (3)
Maybole, North Carrick and Coylton (3)
Prestwick (4)
Troon (4)

Wider politics

UK Parliament
South Ayrshire forms part of two UK Parliamentary constituencies, listed below:

Scottish Parliament
Constituency MSPs
South Ayrshire forms part of two Scottish Parliamentary constituency seats, listed below:

Regional List MSPs
As part of the South Scotland electoral region, South Ayrshire is represented by 7 regional MSPs who are elected to represent the entire South Scotland region – all regional list MSPs elected for the South Scotland region are listed below:

Scottish independence referendum
At the 2014 Scottish independence referendum South Ayrshire rejected independence by an above-average margin of 57.9% "No" to 42.1% "Yes". With a turnout of 86.1%, there were 34,402 "Yes" votes and 47,247 "No" votes. Nationally 55.3% of voters voted "No" in the referendum compared to 44.7%, who voted "Yes" – resulting in Scotland remaining a devolved part of the United Kingdom.

European Union membership referendum
At the 2016 United Kingdom European Union membership referendum a majority of voters in South Ayrshire voted for the United Kingdom to remain a member of the European Union (EU), with 59% of voters in South Ayrshire voting for the United Kingdom to remain a member of the EU and 41% voting for the United Kingdom to leave the European Union. With a turnout of 69.8%, 36,265 votes were cast for remain and 25,241 were cast for leave. 62% of Scottish voters voted remain whilst 38% voted leave, whilst nationally 51.8% of voters in the United Kingdom as a whole voting to leave and 48.2% voting to remain.

References

External links
 

 
Council areas of Scotland
Firth of Clyde